José Solchaga Zala (1881, Aberin, Navarre – 1953) was a Spanish general who fought for the Nationalists in the Spanish Civil War.

A Navarrese professional officer of the Spanish Army, in 1936 he joined the coup against the Republican government. He led the Navarrese troops in the campaign against Guipuzcoa. On 5 August 1936 his troops occupied Irún, cutting off the Republican held zone in the North from the French Frontier and San Sebastían on 13 September. Later, he was promoted to General, led the Nationalist troops in the Biscay campaign In August he led the Navarrese Brigades in the Battle of Santander, and in September 1937 he was one of the Nationalist commanders in the campaign against Asturias., and in March 1938 he led the Navarrese divisions during the Aragon Offensive. In June 1938 he led the Turia Army Corps in the XYZ Line battle. In December 1938, he led the Navarrese Army Corps in the Catalonia Offensive and in March 1939 in the Final offensive of the Spanish Civil War.

Notes

Bibliography
 Beevor, Antony. (2006). The Battle for Spain. The Spanish Civil War. Penguin Books. London. .
 Thomas, Hugh. (2001). The Spanish Civil War. Penguin Books. London. 

1881 births
1953 deaths
People from Estella Oriental
Spanish generals
Spanish military personnel of the Spanish Civil War (National faction)
Francoist Spain
20th-century Spanish military personnel